Subsonic (released January 1, 2002 by the label Curling Legs - CLPCD 71) is a studio album by Vigleik Storaas Trio.

Critical reception
Storaas returns with a new trio recording, backed by Johannes Eick (double bass) and Per Oddvar Johansen (drums). The setting is ideal for a solo excursions by Storaas and the near telepathic interplay with his trio. The material on Subsonic is mostly composed by Storaas and represents a distinct stylistic foil for the trio’s exploration of the modern piano trio’s format. The legacy of Bill Evans is evident throughout the album, but still the trio displays vast amounts of its own identity and character. Introspective and searching at times, but also balanced and sometimes loose in its form, Subsonic vas nominated for Spellemannprisen 2002.

Track listing
"Three Princes" (8:18)
"Mist" (4:24)
"Zik-Zak" (8:05)
"Ar" (10:07) Per Oddvar Johansen
"Subsonic" (6:06) Johannes Eick
"Feng 7" (7:54)

Personnel 
Piano – Vigleik Storaas
Double bass – Johannes Eick
Drums & percussion – Per Oddvar Johansen

Credits 
Engineered and mastered by Jan Erik Kongshaug
Cover photos by Knut Værnes
Cover design by Christin Borge Johansen
Supported by Norsk Kulturråd

Notes 
All compositions by Vigleik Storaas except where noted
Recorded at Rainbow Studios, Oslo, March 2 & 3, 2000
Mixed October 1, 2001

References 

Vigleik Storaas albums
2002 albums